The 1983–84 UTEP Miners men's basketball team represented the University of Texas at El Paso as a member of the Western Athletic Conference during the 1983–84 college basketball season. The team was led by head coach Don Haskins. The Miners finished 27–4 (13–3 in WAC), won the conference tournament title, and reached the NCAA tournament.

Roster

Schedule and results

|-
!colspan=9 style=| Non-conference Regular Season

|-
!colspan=9 style=| WAC Regular Season

|-
!colspan=9 style=| WAC tournament

|-
!colspan=9 style=| NCAA tournament

Rankings

NBA draft

References

UTEP Miners men's basketball seasons
Utep
Utep